The , is a travel document issued by Japan's Ministry of Justice. It is a passport-like booklet with a dark blue cover with the words "難民旅行証明書 REFUGEE TRAVEL DOCUMENT" and two black diagonal lines in the upper left on the front.

Eligibility 
A foreign national resident in Japan with long-term resident status which granted under 1951 convention can apply for a Refugee Travel Document.
De facto refugees holding resident status other than as a 1951 Convention Refugee, including those holding a residence status of student, designated activities, long-term resident, etc. under considerations of humanitarian, are not eligible for a Refugee Travel Document and they are issued a Japan Re-entry Permit as an international travel document instead.

Contents
The current version of Japan Refugee Travel Document is an old style passport-like booklet containing 32 pages, including personal information and instruction pages(1-2), photo and signature page(3), endorsements page(4), extension page(5) and visa pages(6-32), while an unusual requirement "The name of the holder of the document must be repeated in each visa" is printed on each visa pages. There is only a date shows the latest date of the holder to return to Japan as the valid date. Re-entry permit is not required separately. When the Refugee Travel Document holder is outside Japan, the valid date can be extended for up to six months at the embassies or consulates of Japan.

Unlike Japan Re-entry Permit and Japanese passport, the Japan Refugee Travel Document is remaining 1980s old style with handwriting pages, pasted photo and non-IATA standard size, neither MRP zone nor IC chip and lack of modern passport security features. Since refugees granted under 1951 convention among refugees in Japan is extremely few, the number of issuance of Refugee Travel Document is very low which caused the booklet is rarely be redesigned.

Fees
The issuance fee of Japan Refugee Travel Document is JPY5,000.

Visa Free Access or Visa on Arrival
Since the refugee travel document is not a regular national passport, most countries and territories require visa prior to arrival.

The following countries and territories provide visa free access or visa on arrival, as they provide everyone such courtesies.

Asia

See also

 Japan Re-entry Permit
 Refugee Travel Document
 1954 Convention Travel Document
 1954 Convention Relating to the Status of Stateless Persons
 1961 Convention on the Reduction of Statelessness
 Nansen passport

References

International travel documents